Angelina Kanana (born 16 December 1965) is a retired long-distance runner from Kenya, who represented her native country at the 1996 Summer Olympics in the women's marathon race. There she finished in fifteenth place in the overall-rankings. Kanana set her personal best (2:27:24) in the classic distance on 30 April 1995 in Hamburg, Germany.

Achievements

References

External links
 

1965 births
Living people
Kenyan female long-distance runners
Olympic athletes of Kenya
Athletes (track and field) at the 1994 Commonwealth Games
Athletes (track and field) at the 1996 Summer Olympics
Frankfurt Marathon female winners
Commonwealth Games competitors for Kenya
20th-century Kenyan women